The 2019 Rio Open was a professional men's tennis tournament played on outdoor clay courts. It was the sixth edition of the Rio Open, and formed part of the ATP Tour 500 series of the 2019 ATP Tour. It took place in Rio de Janeiro, Brazil between February 18 and 24, 2019.

There was a plan to move the tournament from the clay court surface in Jockey Club Brasileiro to the outdoor hard courts at the Olympic Tennis Centre, which hosted the tennis events of the 2016 Summer Olympics situated in Barra Olympic Park. The intention was to attract more world class players in the tournament such as Novak Djokovic, Roger Federer, and Andy Murray who consistently declined to play the event. Juan Martín del Potro once said to the Rio Open director Luiz Carvalho that he would play Rio Open when the surface changes.

Points and prize money

Point distribution

Prize money 

1 Qualifiers prize money is also the Round of 32 prize money
* per team

Singles main-draw entrants

Seeds 

 1 Rankings as of February 11, 2018.

Other entrants 
The following players received wildcards into the singles main draw:
  Félix Auger-Aliassime
  Thiago Monteiro
  Thiago Seyboth Wild

The following players received entry from the qualifying draw:
  Hugo Dellien
  Juan Ignacio Londero
  Casper Ruud
  Elias Ymer

The following player received entry as a lucky loser:
  Carlos Berlocq

Withdrawals 
Before the tournament
  Pablo Andújar → replaced by  Carlos Berlocq
  Pablo Carreño Busta → replaced by  Cameron Norrie

Retirements 
  Diego Schwartzman
  Aljaž Bedene

Doubles main-draw entrants

Seeds 

 1 Rankings as of February 11, 2019.

Other entrants 
The following pairs received wildcards into the doubles main draw:
  Thomaz Bellucci /  Rogério Dutra Silva
  Thiago Monteiro /  Fernando Romboli

The following pair received entry from the qualifying draw:
  Cameron Norrie /  João Sousa

The following pairs received entry as lucky losers:
  Mateus Alves /  Thiago Seyboth Wild
  Nicholas Monroe /  Miguel Ángel Reyes-Varela

Withdrawals 
Before the tournament
  Fabio Fognini
  Diego Schwartzman

Champions

Singles 

  Laslo Đere def.  Félix Auger-Aliassime, 6–3, 7–5

Doubles 

  Máximo González /  Nicolás Jarry def.  Thomaz Bellucci /  Rogério Dutra Silva, 6–7(3–7), 6–3, [10–7]

References

External links 
 Official website

2019
Rio Open
Rio Open
Rio Open